Masatoshi Ishida may refer to:

Masatoshi Ishida (footballer), Japanese footballer
Masatoshi Ishida (politician), Japanese politician